Blair Brandt (born January 11, 1988) is an American political advisor and real estate entrepreneur. Brandt is also a former reality television personality and an animal welfare advocate. He is the co-founder of Next Step Realty. Forbes listed Brandt in their annual 30 under 30 list, at the age of 23.

In August 2015, Brandt began his role in ABC Family's docu-series Next Step Realty: NYC. In 2020, Brandt founded his own political consulting firm, The Brandt Group.

Early life and education
Brandt was born in Manhattan, New York.  He grew up in Palm Beach, Florida and attended Deerfield Academy in Massachusetts. Brandt completed his undergraduate education at the University of Richmond.

Political engagement 
A prominent ally of the Trump Administration, Brandt is a leading Republican strategist and top GOP fundraiser. Brandt served as the Florida Co-Chair for the Trump Victory Finance Committee 2020. Brandt has also served as an advisor to Lara Trump. Brandt has routinely weighed in on US-China relations, specifically as an advocate for a fundamental re-alignment or decoupling of economic ties.

Real estate ventures
Brandt's first job was working for Budweiser in the breakage (broken bottle re-assembly) room and while he studied at University of Richmond he also ran a laundry business.

Brandt started working as a realtor after he was cut from a Wall Street internship at Lazard Ltd. He spent the summer  working for an independent Florida realtor named Christian Angle. At the time he noticed a number of age related problems with the role. During his time with Angle servicing luxury sales clients, Brandt thought about providing the luxury service he observed to “kids right out of college who aren’t there yet but might be in that category eventually”.

After speaking to a number of friends about their realtor experiences in New York City, he noticed there could be an opportunity to assist young professionals in finding their first home in New York City. "My friends were college graduates not getting good service," Brandt told Business Insider. In 2010, as a response to this deficit, Brandt co-founded The Next Step Realty. Brandt and co-founder Belton Baker came up with the idea to provide an urban apartment-finding service to new graduates and wrote 35-page business plan overnight that resulted in $19,000 in venture capital from friends and family. Some of the first few weeks of the company's operation were carried out from Brandt's University of Richmond dorm room.

In July 2011, shortly after the foundation of the company, it was listed by CNN as one of the most promising dorm room startups.

After the initial success of his company, Brandt acquired competitor Post Graduate Apartments in 2012. At 23, Brandt was included in the Forbes 30 under 30 list for his work in the real estate market.

With a seed infusion of $100,000 from Nantucket & Palm Beach based angel investor Jason Briggs, Brandt moved to New York City in 2012 to turn his idea, then a website matching graduates with various approved realtors, into a full-service brokerage in the city.

According to the Next Step Realty website, Brandt now serves as Non-Executive Chairman of the Board.

Next Step Realty: NYC
In April 2015, it was announced that Brandt would appear in a new show focused on his firm Next Step Realty that would premiere on ABC Family, titled Next Step Realty: NYC. The show premiered on August 11, 2015. The show followed him and his employees as they build their real estate brokerage firm in NYC. The idea for show started through an employee of Brandt's. "Truth be told, an intern of mine was at a family dinner which included some people from ABC Family", Brandt said in an interview. According to Brandt, the show is "a story about startups and entrepreneurs, but it’s also a story about young people graduating from college or people that are newcomers to New York City moving here, following their dreams, renting and what goes into that as well.". Executive Producer Danielle Rossen said of the show, "With this show, Blair and his team are renting apartments, but selling the lifestyle." In light of the show, New York Daily News called Brandt "The new face of real estate reality TV." Brandt said “You hear about all these young companies but you never actually get to see how it all goes down every day behind the scenes.”

Animal welfare advocacy
On July 9, 2018, Brandt co-moderated a meeting in the Roosevelt Room of the White House West Wing, in which commercial dog breeders, animal welfare activists, officials from the Trump Administration, Rep Matt Gaetz (R-FL), Rep Lou Barletta (R-PA), Rep Brian Fitzpatrick (R-PA), First Family member Lara Trump, and other stakeholders met to discuss "raising the standards of care for dogs at large-scale commercial breeding operations", some of which are often to referred to by animal welfare activists as “puppy mills”. Brandt was described by The Humane Society of the United States as an “animal welfare advocate.”

In January 2019, The Humane Society of the United States announced that they would be presenting Brandt with the “Humane Leader Award”, alongside Lara Trump and Pam Bondi, for his efforts to end Greyhound racing in the State of Florida.

On February 8, 2019 in Palm Beach, FL, Brandt was presented with the Humane Leader Award by The Humane Society of the United States for his “commitment to the protection of Greyhounds in Florida.”

Brandt received the award at a fundraiser which featured “GOP stars” and animal welfare advocates Lara Trump, Pam Bondi, and Matt Gaetz. The event was hosted by John Rakolta, who was nominated in May 2018 by President Donald Trump to be the next United States Ambassador to the United Arab Emirates.

The purpose of the evening was to “thank Brandt, a Palm Beach resident,” and fundraise to “re-home the thousands of greyhounds that will be displaced...including medical care for injured dogs, training and transportation...”

According to The Palm Beach Post, Brandt “crafted and marshaled the campaign’s political and public relations strategy among a group of unlikely supporters: Republicans.” Brandt was also credited with "arranging media interviews with Lara Trump at Mar-a-Lago and urging sympathetic conservative lawmakers to write op-ed pieces for local newspapers.” 

Those efforts “resulted in 69 percent of Florida voters approving a constitutional amendment ...that will phase out dog racing by 2020.”

On November 25, 2019, President Donald Trump signed into law the PACT ACT, the Preventing Animal Cruelty and Torture (PACT) Act, which authorized the FBI and other federal law enforcement agencies to prosecute malicious animal cruelty. The Humane Society of the United States credited Brandt, alongside Lara Trump, with “championing this bill and helping to shepherd it into law." Animal Wellness Action reported that Brandt and Lara Trump had encouraged President Trump to "put a capstone on our nation’s legal framework against animal cruelty."

Amidst the Coronavirus pandemic, Brandt advocated in the Washington Examiner on April 6, 2020 for the closures of Chinese wet markets and the dog and cat meat trade alongside voices including Lara Trump, Dr Anthony Fauci, Senator Lindsey Graham, and Kevin McCarthy. On April 8, 2020, The Chinese Ministry of Agriculture announced a plan to end dog and cat meat trade on May 8, 2020, citing public concern following COVID-19.

Personal life
Brandt is the son of Laura Vitale and arts patron Laurence Brandt Levine.  His father, Laurence Brandt Levine, a Princeton University graduate who became the first Chairman of the Dreyfoos School of the Arts, died in 2013. At the age of 16, Brandt negotiated his parents' divorce, saving his mother thousands in lawyer fees. Brandt began dating real estate agent Margit Weinberg,  which was showcased on Next Step Realty: NYC. In an interview with Sandy Kenyon, reflecting on the relationship being used as a storyline for the show, Brandt said "It's not easy. And I didn't want to originally" . Brandt & Weinberg married, and became parents to a son in December 2016. Brandt's full-time residence is in Palm Beach, FL.

References

External links
 TheNextStepRealty.com

1988 births
Living people
American real estate businesspeople
Deerfield Academy alumni
University of Richmond alumni